Qaleh Ochaq (also Romanized as Qal'eh Ochāq and Qal'eh Ojāq) is a village in Gol Gol Rural District, in the Central District of Kuhdasht County, Lorestan Province, Iran. At the 2006 census, its population was 20, in 4 families.

References 

Towns and villages in Kuhdasht County